Bonnie Huy (October 19, 1935 – May 9, 2013) was an American politician from Kansas.

Born in Boise, Idaho, Huy worked in the aviation industry before retiring and entering into politics.

She served in the Kansas House of Representatives 2001–2007, as a Republican, from Wichita, Kansas.

She was married to John Huy. She died on May 9, 2013, at age 77.

Notes

1935 births
2013 deaths
People from Boise, Idaho
Politicians from Wichita, Kansas
Women state legislators in Kansas
Republican Party members of the Kansas House of Representatives
21st-century American women politicians
21st-century American politicians